Lancaster Township is one of twelve townships in Huntington County, Indiana, United States. As of the 2010 census, its population was 1,150 and it contained 472 housing units.

History
Lancaster Township was founded in 1837.

Geography

Cities and towns
 Mount Etna (northeast half)

Unincorporated towns
 Harlansburg
 Lancaster
 Majenica

Extinct towns
 River

Adjacent townships
 Huntington Township (north)
 Union Township (northeast)
 Rock Creek Township (east)
 Salamonie Township (southeast)
 Jefferson Township (south)
 Wayne Township (southwest)
 Polk Township (west)
 Dallas Township (northwest)

Cemeteries
The township contains three cemeteries: German Settlement, Loon Creek and Rees.

Major highways
  Indiana State Road 5
  Indiana State Road 37
  Indiana State Road 124

References
 
 United States Census Bureau cartographic boundary files

External links
 Indiana Township Association
 United Township Association of Indiana

Townships in Huntington County, Indiana
Townships in Indiana